Vila Chã may refer to the following places in Portugal:

 Vila Chã (Alijó), a civil parish in the municipality of Alijó
 Vila Chã (Esposende), a civil parish in the municipality of Esposende 
 Vila Chã (Fornos de Algodres), a parish in the municipality of Fornos de Algodres
 Vila Chã (Vale de Cambra), a parish in the municipality of Vale de Cambra
 Vila Chã (Vila do Conde), a parish in the municipality of Vila do Conde
 Santiago de Vila Chã (Ponte da Barca), a civil parish in the municipality of Ponta da Barca
 São João Baptista de Vila Chã (Ponta da Barca), a parish in the municipality of Ponta da Barca
 Vila Chã da Beira (Tarouca), a civil parish in the municipality of Tarouca
 Vila Chã de Braciosa (Miranda do Douro), a civil parish in the municipality of Miranda do Douro
 Vila Chã de Ourique (Cartaxo), a civil parish in the municipality of Cartaxo 
 Vila Chã de Sá (Viseu), a civil parish in the municipality of Viseu
 Vila Chã da Beira (Amarante), a civil parish in the municipality of Amarante